The 1996–97 Southern Football League season was the 94th in the history of the league, an English football competition.

Gresley Rovers won the Premier Division. However, as their ground failed to meet the required standard, second-placed Cheltenham Town were promoted to the Football Conference instead. Baldock Town, Chelmsford City and Newport were relegated to the Midland and Southern Divisions, whilst Sudbury Town (who had finished in thirteenth place) resigned from the league and dropped into the Eastern Counties League due to financial problems.

Tamworth, Forest Green Rovers, Rothwell Town and St Leonards Stamcroft (in their first season in the Southern League) were promoted to the Premier Division, the former two as champions of their divisions. Meanwhile, Midland Division club Dudley Town resigned from the league at the end of the season and did not compete in any competitions the following season. Leicester United folded during the season, and Buckingham Town were relegated to the United Counties League.

Premier Division
The Premier Division consisted of 22 clubs, including 18 clubs from the previous season and four new clubs:
Two clubs promoted from the Midland Division:
King's Lynn
Nuneaton Borough

Two clubs promoted from the Southern Division:
Ashford Town (Kent)
Sittingbourne

League table

Midland Division
The Midland Division consisted of 22 clubs, including 17 clubs from the previous season and five new clubs:
Three clubs relegated from the Premier Division:
Ilkeston Town
Stafford Rangers
VS Rugby

Plus:
Raunds Town, promoted from the United Counties League
Shepshed Dynamo, promoted from the Midland Alliance

At the end of the season Hinckley Town merged with Midland Alliance club Hinckley Athletic to form Hinckley United.

League table

Southern Division
The Southern Division consisted of 22 clubs, including 18 clubs from the previous season and four new clubs:
Buckingham Town, transferred from the Midland Division
Cirencester Town, promoted from the Hellenic League
Dartford, promoted from the Kent League
Stamco, who also changed name to St. Leonards Stamcroft, promoted from the Sussex County League

League table

See also
Southern Football League
1996–97 Isthmian League
1996–97 Northern Premier League

References

Southern Football League seasons
6